The International Association for the Protection of Intellectual Property or AIPPI, an acronym for Association Internationale pour la Protection de la Propriété Intellectuelle in French (formerly International Association for the Protection of Industrial Property), is a non-profit international organisation (NGO). Its members are intellectual property (IP) professionals, academics, owners of intellectual property and others interested in the subject. AIPPI was established in 1897.

Overview
The International Association for the Protection of Intellectual Property, known as AIPPI, is the world’s leading non-profit association dedicated to the development and improvement of laws for the protection of intellectual property. It is a politically neutral, non-profit organisation, based in Switzerland with over 8000 members worldwide from 131 countries. 

AIPPI’s members are private practitioners and in-house lawyers, attorneys and agents, as well as judges, academics and government officials. 

AIPPI is organised into 68 National and 2 Regional Groups. Membership in AIPPI is obtained by joining one of these National or Regional Groups of AIPPI. In countries where no Group exists, individuals may be granted Independent Membership directly in AIPPI.

Purpose 
The objective of AIPPI is to improve and promote the protection of intellectual property on both international and national levels. It pursues this objective by working for the development, expansion and improvement of international and regional treaties, agreements and national laws. By working to improve and harmonise IP protection at international meetings, mutual understanding across national borders is deepened. Where appropriate, AIPPI intervenes with submissions before major courts and legislative bodies to advocate for strengthened IP protection. 

Committees within AIPPI monitor current developments, long-range projects, and conduct AIPPI’s substantive work: the study of issues of topical concern in the IP world. Reports regarding these issues are developed and used in preparing draft Resolutions, which are then discussed at the annual World Congress, leading to a final Resolution which is adopted by the Executive Committee. 

Through AIPPI’s Resolutions and regular high-level contact with other NGOs and international and regional institutions, the Association has exerted a major influence on the development of international IP law. AIPPI’s representatives act as its ambassadors by liaising with important organisations and promoting mutual coordination and cooperation.

History 
The origins of AIPPI, the International Association for the Protection of Intellectual Property, date back to 1897, shortly following the signature of the Paris Convention for the Protection of Industrial Property in 1883. Although the two World Wars caused interruptions in AIPPI activities, the Association was revived each time, ultimately finding its centre of gravity in Switzerland. 

The development of AIPPI to its present form has been continuous. From its roots in Western Europe, it has become a truly international Association, encompassing Eastern European countries, North, South and Central America, Asia (including large National Groups in China, Japan and South Korea), Australia, New Zealand and much of Africa. 

Throughout its long history, AIPPI has adopted more than 700 Resolutions and Reports. The presentation of these Resolutions and Reports to International Governmental Organisations, WIPO in particular, has contributed considerably to the development, improvement and harmonisation of the international protection of IP.

World Congress 
AIPPI holds an annual World Congress in various locations around the world, attracting around 2000 leading practitioners, corporations, government and IP Office officials, judges, academics and other parties interested in IP. 

AIPPI World Congresses have an Educational Programme, which boosts professional development by offering panel sessions addressing all areas of IP, including a designated Pharma Day. Other signature sessions such as the themed IP lunches, leadership meetings, and roundtable discussions (AIPPI Cafés) are also part of the World Congress programme. 

Evenings are complete with Congress and private social functions, that take advantage of the host city’s historical and cultural settings. This yearly international event provides an excellent opportunity to meet and build personal and professional relationships.

Other Activities 
Other online events are held throughout the year, such as the Young AIPPI Members Summit and various webinars organised by AIPPI and its National and Regional Groups. 

There are further in-person meetings organised by the National and Regional Groups, for example, yearly Trilateral Meetings. 

AIPPI publishes newsletters that provide important updates on the latest developments in intellectual property from around the world to help the IP community keep up to date as well as informed of its most recent activities.

Becoming a member of AIPPI 
If you are interested in Membership, AIPPI invites you to join your country’s National or Regional Group. According to AIPPI’s Statutes, all Members of a National or Regional Group are automatically Members of AIPPI. 

If your principal professional or business activity is located in a country where no National or Regional Group of AIPPI exists, you may join as an Independent Member. 

Please fill out the Membership Application Form located on our website, www.aippi.org. The information provided will then be forwarded to the officers of the National or Regional Group in your country or, in the case of a prospective Independent Member, to the General Secretariat for initiation of the registration process.

See also 
 Intellectual property organization
 American Intellectual Property Law Association (AIPLA)
 European Union Intellectual Property Office (EUIPO)
 World Intellectual Property Organization (WIPO)

References

Further reading

External links 
 

Organizations established in 1897
Intellectual property organizations